Three Colors: Red (Rouge: Bande Originale Du Film) is the soundtrack album to the award-winning film Three Colors: Red, with music composed by Zbigniew Preisner. The music is performed by the Sinfonia Varsovia (Beata Rybotycka, Elżbieta Towarnicka, Jacek Ostaszewski, Konrad Mastyło, Silesian Filharmonic Choir, Sinfonia Varsovia, Wojciech Michniewski - conductor).

Track listing
 Miłość od pierwszego wejrzenia – 4:28	
 Fashion Show I – 4:46	
 Meeting the Judge – 0:59	
 The Tapped Conversation – 1:17	
 Leaving the Judge – 1:48	
 Psychoanalysis – 2:05	
 Today Is My Birthday – 3:21	
 Do Not Take Another Man's Wife I – 2:09	
 Treason – 3:24	
 Fashion Show II – 1:24	
 Conversation at the Theatre – 3:45	
 The Rest of the Conversation at the Theatre – 1:28	
 Do Not Take Another Man's Wife II – 2:14	
 Catastrophe – 0:47	
 Finale – 2:58	
 L'Amour Au Premier Regard – 4:27

Trivia
The music also depicts compositions by Van den Budenmayer, a fictional Dutch composer, created by Zbigniew Preisner who also features in other compositions made for Kieslowski's films, such as The Double Life of Veronique, Dekalog and Three Colors: Blue.

Three Colors soundtracks 
 Three Colors: Blue (soundtrack)
 Three Colors: White (soundtrack)
 Three Colors: Red (soundtrack)

References

1994 soundtrack albums
Romance film soundtracks